The 2003 All-Ireland Under-21 Hurling Championship was the 40th staging of the All-Ireland Under-21 Hurling Championship since its establishment by the Gaelic Athletic Association in 1964.

Limerick were the defending champions, however, they were defeated in their quest for a record-equalling fourth successive All-Ireland title by Cork in the Munster semi-final.

On 21 September 2003, Kilkenny won the championship following a 2-13 to 0-12 defeat of Galway in the All-Ireland final. This was their 8th All-Ireland title in the under-21 grade and their first in four championship seasons.

Results

Leinster Under-21 Hurling Championship

Quarter-finals

Semi-finals

Final

Munster Under-21 Hurling Championship

Quarter-finals

Semi-finals

Final

Ulster Under-21 Hurling Championship

Final

All-Ireland Under-21 Hurling Championship

Semi-finals

Final

Championship statistics

Miscellaneous

 Down win the Ulster title for the first time since 1990.

Scoring statistics

Overall

Single game

References

Under-21
All-Ireland Under-21 Hurling Championship